Charles Burney  was an Anglican priest: the Archdeacon of Kingston-upon-Thames from 1879 to 1904.

The son of a clergyman, Burney was educated at Magdalen College, Oxford. He was ordained in 1838 and began his career as a curate at his father's church in Sible Hedingham.
 
He was Vicar of Halstead from 1850 to 1864; Rector of Wickham Bishops from 1864 to 1870 and Vicar of St Mark's Church, Surbiton, from 1870.

He died on 1 January 1907.

References

Alumni of Magdalen College, Oxford
Archdeacons of Kingston upon Thames
1907 deaths
Year of birth missing